The 1941 Big Ten Conference football season was the 46th season of college football played by the member schools of the Big Ten Conference (also known as the Western Conference) and was a part of the 1941 college football season.

The 1941 Minnesota Golden Gophers football team, led by head coach Bernie Bierman, compiled a perfect 8–0 record, led the conference in both scoring offense and scoring defense, was ranked No. 1 in the final AP Poll, and won the program's second consecutive national championship. Halfback Bruce Smith was a consensus All-American and won the 1941 Heisman Trophy. Tackle Dick Wildung was also a consensus first-team All-American. 

Michigan, under head coach Fritz Crisler, compiled a 6–1–1 record, outscored opponents 147 to 41, and was ranked No. 5 in the final AP Poll. Fullback Bob Westfall was selected as a consensus first-team player on the 1941 College Football All-America Team. In addition to Westfall, two other Michigan players received first-team honors on the 1941 All-Big Ten Conference football team: center Robert Ingalls and tackle Al Wistert.

Ohio State, under head coach Paul Brown, compiled a 6–1–1 record, outscored opponents 167 to 110, and was ranked No. 13 in the final AP Poll. In the Chicago Tribunes poll of coaches, officials and experts, Ohio State fullback Jack Graf was selected as the Big Ten's most valuable player.

Northwestern lost to three top 10 teams (Minnesota, Michigan, and Notre Dame) and was ranked No. 11 in the final AP Poll. Two Northwestern players received first-team honors on the All-Big Ten team: tackle Alf Bauman and end Bob Motl. The team also featured halfback Otto Graham who was later inducted into the Pro and College Football Halls of Fame.

Season overview

Results and team statisticsKey'
PPG = Average of points scored per game
PAG = Average of points allowed per game
MVP = Most valuable player as voted by players on each team as part of the voting process to determine the winner of the Chicago Tribune Silver Football trophy

Regular season

September 27
Six conference teams opened their seasons on September 27, playing six games against non-conference opponents, resulting in four wins and two losses. Northwestern, Wisconsin and Illinois did not play.

October 4
Eight conference teams played games on October 4, consisting of one conference matchup and six non-conference games. The non-conference games resulted in four wins and two losses. Minnesota did not play.

October 11
Six conference teams played games on October 11, consisting of two conference matchups and two non-conference games. The non-conference games resulted in a win and a loss. Ohio State, Iowa, and Purdue did not play. After three weeks, Big Ten teams had compiled a non-conference record of 9–4.

October 18
All nine conference teams saw action on October 18, consisting of three conference games and three non-conference games. In the week's biggest matchup, No. 6 Michigan defeated No. 5 Northwestern.  The non-conference games resulted in three wins. After four weeks, Big Ten teams had compiled a non-conference record of 12–4.

October 25
All nine conference teams saw action on October 25, consisting of four conference games and one non-conference game. In the week's biggest matchups, No. 1 Minnesota defeated No. 3 Michigan, and No. 13 Northwestern defeated No. 11 Ohio State.  The non-conference game resulted in three wins. After five weeks, Big Ten teams had compiled a non-conference record of 12–5.

November 1
All nine conference teams saw action on November 1, consisting of three conference games and three non-conference games. In the week's biggest matchup, No. 1 Minnesota defeated No. 9 Northwestern. The non-conference games resulted in one win and two losses. After six weeks, Big Ten teams had compiled a non-conference record of 13–7.

November 8
Eight conference teams played games on November 8, consisting of three conference games and two non-conference games. The non-conference games resulted in a win and a tie. After seven weeks, Big Ten teams had compiled a non-conference record of 14–7–1. Michigan did not play.

November 15
Eight conference teams played games on November 15, consisting of three conference games and two non-conference games. The non-conference games resulted in a win and a loss. In the week's biggest matchup, No. 5 Notre Dame defeated No. 8 Northwestern. After eight weeks, Big Ten teams had compiled a non-conference record of 15–8–1. Indiana did not play.

November 22
All nine conference teams played games on November 22, consisting of four conference games and one non-conference game. In the week's biggest matchup, No. 7 Michigan played No. 14 Ohio State to a 20–20 tie. The non-conference game resulted in a loss. Big Ten teams finished the season with a non-conference record of 15–9–1.

Bowl games
During the 1941 season, the Big Ten maintained its long-standing ban on postseason games. Accordingly, no Big Ten teams participated in any bowl games.

All-Big Ten players

The following players were picked by the Associated Press (AP), the United Press (UP), and/or the International News Service (INS) as first-team players on the 1941 All-Big Ten Conference football team.

 Dave Schreiner, end, Wisconsin (AP, UP, INS)
 Bob Motl, end, Northwestern (AP, INS)
 Bob Fitch, end, Minnesota (UP)
 Alf Bauman, tackle, Northwestern (AP, UP, INS)
 Dick Wildung, tackle, Minnesota (AP, UP, INS)
 Tom Melton, guard, Purdue (AP, UP)
 Len Levy, guard, Minnesota (AP, UP)
 Al Wistert, guard, Michigan (INS)
 Fritz Howard, guard, Ohio State (INS)
 Robert Ingalls, center, Michigan (AP, UP)
 Iron Man Bob Johnson, center, Purdue (INS)
 Billy Hillenbrand, quarterback, Indiana (AP, UP, INS)
 Bill Daley, halfback, Minnesota (AP, UP)
 Bruce Smith, halfback, Minnesota (AP, INS) (1941 Heisman Trophy winner)
 Bob Westfall, fullback, Michigan (AP, UP, INS)
 Pat Harder, fullback, Wisconsin (UP, INS)

All-Americans

At the end of the 1941 season, Big Ten players secured three of the 12 consensus first-team picks for the 1941 College Football All-America Team. The Big Ten's consensus All-Americans were:

 Dick Wildung, tackle, Minnesota (AAB, AP, INS, LIB, NEA, NW, SN, UP, CP, LIFE, PARA, WC)
 Bruce Smith, halfback, Minnesota (AAB, AP, CO, INS, NW, SN, UP, CP, NYS, LIFE, PARA, WC, LIFE)
 Bob Westfall, fullback, Michigan (AAB, CO, INS, LIB, NEA, NW, SN, UP, CP, NYS, PARA, WC)

Other Big Ten players who were named first-team All-Americans by at least one selector were:
 Dave Schreiner, end, Wisconsin (AP)
 Alf Bauman, tackle, Northwestern (AAB, SN, LIFE)
 Jim Daniell, tackle, Ohio State (CP)

1942 NFL Draft
Two Big Ten players, Bob Westfall and Urban Odson, were selected in the first round of the 1942 NFL Draft. In all, 26 players from Big Ten football teams were selected in the 1942 NFL Draft, as follows:

References